Scoliacma is a genus of tiger moths in the family Erebidae. The genus was erected by Edward Meyrick in 1886.

Species

Former species
 Scoliacma nephelozona (Meyrick, 1889)

References

Lithosiina
Moth genera